Desbordesia is a group of African trees in the family Irvingiaceae, described as a genus in 1905. There is only one known species, Desbordesia glaucescens, native to central Africa (Nigeria, Cameroon, Gabon, Equatorial Guinea, the Republic of the Congo and the Democratic Republic of the Congo).

References

Irvingiaceae
Monotypic Malpighiales genera
Flora of Africa